Rudolf Heinrich Schenker (born 31 August 1948) is a German guitarist, founder and leader of the hard rock band Scorpions. He is the rhythm guitarist, primary songwriter and longest-serving original member of the band. He is also the CEO/owner-manager of the Scorpions Musik-Produktions-und Verlagsgesellschaft mbH (Scorpions music production and publishing company) and owner/founder of the Scorpio-Sound-Studios in Lower Saxony.

Career
Since founding Scorpions in 1965, Schenker has become one of the major driving forces in the band's songwriting and musical direction. He has been Scorpions' most consistent member, appearing on every album and every tour. His younger brother Michael Schenker was a member of the Scorpions in the band's early days, before joining UFO.  

Schenker was awarded the City of Hanover Plaque as well as the Cross of Merit First Class of the Lower Saxony Order of Merit in 2000.

Playing style
In an interview on World Wide Live video, Schenker mentioned that his goal is grounded in compositional skill more than technical skill. While most Scorpions' guitar solos are performed by lead guitarist Matthias Jabs, there are some notable exceptions in which Schenker plays the solos instead of rhythm guitar, such as "Wind of Change", "Always Somewhere", "Still Loving You", "Send Me an Angel", "Lady Starlight", "Big City Nights", "As Soon as the Good Times Roll", "When the Smoke Is Going Down", "Animal Magnetism", "Through My Eyes", "SLY" and "Rock 'N' Roll Band".

Schenker is known for his energetic riffing and wild live performances, which often includes swinging his guitar over his head and throwing the guitar up and catching it.

He also sang lead vocals on four Scorpions songs: "They Need a Million", "Drifting Sun", "Hey You" and "Love is the Answer".

Equipment

While Schenker began playing with a Fender Stratocaster, he is primarily known for playing Gibson Flying Vs. On the Acoustica DVD, he is seen playing an acoustic Flying V made especially for him by Dommenget. He now uses Dean acoustic V models. Some of Schenker's main live guitars in recent years have been Dommenget — the same maker that produced Klaus Meine's live guitar and many guitars for Matthias Jabs. Schenker's signature models are "Gibson Rudolf Schenker Flying V", the Dommenget "Ferrari" V, PGG "Scorpions Golden Jubilee" Flying V, PGG "Veetle" Flying V and the "Scorpions" V. In the past, he primarily used Marshall amps, using their JMP, JCM800 2203, and JCM800 2205 heads. Currently, he uses ENGL amps, endorsing the E 650 Ritchie Blackmore signature heads.

References

External links
 Official site for Rudolf Schenker's biography -- (broken link as of dec 16, 2020)
 The Second Supper interview with Rudolf Schenker -- (broken link as of dec 16, 2020)
 Rudolf Schenker audio interview on Guitar Jam Daily
 Interview with Rudolf Schenker (2010)

1948 births
Living people
People from Hildesheim
German rock guitarists
German male guitarists
German heavy metal guitarists
Scorpions (band) members
Rhythm guitarists
Glam metal musicians